Richard "Dick" Farnsworth is an American politician from Maine. Farnsworth, a Democrat, served in the Maine House of Representatives from 1996 to 1998 for District 32, then part of Portland. He chose not to seek re-election in 1998. In 2012, Farnsworth again sought election to the Maine House of Representatives, this time from the renamed District 117, also part of Portland. He won and was sworn in for a second time in December 2012.

Farnsworth earned a B.S. in Education from Ohio State University, a Master's in Divinity from Boston University and an Ed.D. from Temple University.

References

External links
  State House Profile
  Official Facebook Page

Year of birth missing (living people)
Living people
Politicians from Portland, Maine
Ohio State University College of Education and Human Ecology alumni
Boston University School of Theology alumni
Temple University College of Education alumni
Democratic Party members of the Maine House of Representatives
21st-century American politicians